With regard to materials science, a material is said to be "Newtonian" if it exhibits a linear relationship between stress and strain rate.

See also
Stress
 Strain
Classical mechanics

References

Classical mechanics
Continuum mechanics
Materials science